Łukasz Zbonikowski (born 20 February 1978 in Toruń) is a Polish politician. He was elected to the Sejm on 25 September 2005, getting 7209 votes in 5 Toruń district as a candidate from the Law and Justice list.

See also
Members of Polish Sejm 2005-2007

External links
Łukasz Zbonikowski - parliamentary page - includes declarations of interest, voting record, and transcripts of speeches.

1978 births
Living people
People from Toruń
Members of the Polish Sejm 2005–2007
Law and Justice politicians
Members of the Polish Sejm 2007–2011
Members of the Polish Sejm 2011–2015